The Rural Municipality of Sliding Hills No. 273 is a rural municipality (RM) in the Canadian province of Saskatchewan within Census Division No. 9 and  Division No. 4.

History 
The RM of Sliding Hills No. 273 incorporated as a rural municipality on January 1, 1913.

Heritage properties
There are three historical buildings located within the RM.
Greek Catholic Church of Transfiguration (also called the Dneiper Catholic Church) - Constructed in 1931 in a byzantine cruciform style.  The church is of historic significance within the community.
Holy Assumption St. Mary’s Ukrainian Orthodox Church (also called Holy Assumption of St. Mary and the Boychuk Church) - Constructed in 1902 and officially opened in 1927, the church still hosts an annual service attended by descendants of early immigrants to the area.
St. Michael’s Ukrainian Orthodox Church - Constructed in 1924, the church includes a separate bell tower and is of historical significance in the community.

Demographics 

Government 
The RM of Sliding Hills No. 273 is governed by an elected municipal council and an appointed administrator that meets on the second Monday of every month. The reeve of the RM is Harvey Malanowich while its administrator is Todd Steele. The RM's office is located in Mikado.

Transportation 
Passenger rail service is provided to the RM by Via Rail at its Mikado flag stop.

References 

Sliding Hills
 
Division No. 9, Saskatchewan